L. purpureum may refer to:
 Lamium purpureum, the red deadnettle, purple deadnettle or purple archangel, a herbaceous flowering plant species native to Europe and Asia
 Lasiopetalum purpureum, a synonym for Thomasia purpurea, a shrub species found in Australia

See also 
 Purpureum (disambiguation)